Tarleton Perry Crawford (May 8, 1821 – April 7, 1902) was a Baptist missionary to Shandong, China for 50 years with his wife.

Early life and education
Crawford was born in Warren County, Kentucky. He was the fourth son of John and Lucretia Crawford, who were Baptists. He had a believer's baptism at the age of sixteen. Later he said: "I will spend my life in telling of Jesus' great mercy." He dedicated his life to mission work in China.

At the beginning of 1848 he entered Union University in Murfreesboro, Tennessee, where his studies were supported in part by the West Tennessee Baptist Convention. He graduated in 1851 at the head of his class.

Crawford worked on a farm in Denmark, Tennessee to help pay for his early education.  He attended the Denmark Male Academy where he was top of his class.  The Big Hatchie Baptist Association helped pay his way to Union University. The women of Browns Creek, Big Black Creek, Maple Springs and Clover Creek Baptist churches all sold their eggs and milk gathered on Sundays to help support him, and later Lottie Moon. He was first ordained by the Big Black Creek Baptist Church in Denmark, Tennessee.  Brother Obediah Dodson was his pastor and very passionate about missions.

Marriage and family
Crawford married fellow Baptist Martha Foster.  They married on March 12, 1851 at her home in Tuscaloosa County, Alabama, a week after their engagement.

Career
At the close of 1850 Crawford was appointed as missionary to Shanghai, China by the Foreign Mission Board of the Southern Baptist Convention. Posted initially to Shanghai in 1852, Crawford and his wife Martha moved to Dengzhou in Shandong, perhaps to gain more independence from mission oversight. Crawford had a domineering character that caused much dissent; some Americans were concerned and he was rebuked by the American consul in Shanghai.

Crawford insisted that preaching was the sole duty of the missionary.  He was dismayed by the fiasco involving Charles Gutzlaff's Chinese evangelists. He thereafter insisted Chinese should never be paid out of mission funds. His friend Dr. George Burton's becoming exhausted due to excessive medical work in Shanghai reinforced Crawford's central conviction. Crawford itinerated  widely around local villages (131 in 1875 alone). His singlemindedness meant that he closed down his wife's school in 1879, perhaps out of jealousy at her success with Lottie Moon at Shaling.

He continued to criticize the mission board of the American Southern Baptist Mission, who he thought should have no say on mission matters.  They disagreed and removed him in 1892.

Crawford formed the Gospel Mission, and eight (of fourteen) Southern Baptist missionaries joined him. By the turn of the century, the mission had grown to nineteen.  All the Gospel missioners wore Chinese clothing, lived in Chinese houses, and solely preached the gospel.  This was similar to the practices of the missionaries of the China Inland Mission.  Southern Baptist Convention missionaries struggled with Crawford's "unattractive social philosophy and his refusal to give sensible leadership to the Christian Chinese." (Hyatt, 1976:59)

Martha Crawford remained loyal to her husband, although she disagreed with several of his views.  In 1867 she formed a boys' school in their home. Several of the students went on to become pastors at the successful Huangxian and Pingdu stations. She also wrote The Three Maidens, a book for children, which was subsequently widely used throughout China. At the Second Missionary Conference (1877), she spoke on "Women's Work for Women", stressing missionary wives should visit house-to-house, personally instruct local women, and prepare suitable literature for them.

In his book The Patriarchal Dynasties, Crawford announced his conviction that in 1876 the world was 14,376 years old. He believed that the Garden of Eden was a theocratic confederacy, with a population of 1,174,405,120.

See also
C.W. Pruitt
Anna Seward Pruitt

Citations

Sources
 

1821 births
1902 deaths
People from Warren County, Kentucky
Baptist missionaries from the United States
Baptist missionaries in China
American expatriates in China
Baptists from Kentucky